Sualkuchi Budram Madhab Satradhikar College, established in 1963, is a general degree college situated in Sualkuchi, Assam. This college is affiliated with the Gauhati University.

Departments

Science
Physics
Mathematics
Chemistry
Computer Science
Botany
Zoology

Arts and Commerce
Assamese
English
Sanskrit
History
Education
Economics
Philosophy
Political Science

References

External links
http://www.sbmscollege.org/index.html

Universities and colleges in Assam
Colleges affiliated to Gauhati University
Educational institutions established in 1963
1963 establishments in Assam